John Frederick Sackville, 3rd Duke of Dorset, KG (25 March 174519 July 1799) was the only son of Lord John Philip Sackville, second son of Lionel Sackville, 1st Duke of Dorset. His mother was the former Lady Frances Leveson-Gower. He succeeded to the dukedom in 1769 on the death of his uncle, Charles Sackville, 2nd Duke of Dorset. He was the British Ambassador to France from 1784 and returned to England in August 1789 following the escalation of the French Revolution.

Dorset is remembered for his love of cricket. He was both a good player and an important patron, but his interest was sharpened by gambling, cricket being a major attraction for gamblers throughout the 18th century. His other sporting interests included billiards and tennis. He also acquired a reputation as a womaniser.

Politics
Dorset was returned unopposed as the Member of Parliament for the county of Kent in 1768, sitting until he became the 3rd Duke of Dorset on the death of his uncle in 1769. He was appointed Lord Lieutenant of Kent in 1769, a position he held until 1797. He was Captain of the Yeomen of the Guard in 1783 before going to Paris the next year. After he returned to England, he served as Lord Steward of the Household until his death.

Cricket

The young John Sackville was schooled at Westminster, where he first became a noted proponent of cricket. He went on to join Hambledon Cricket Club, based in Hambledon, Hampshire, which was the leading cricket club of the day. He was joined there by Sir Horatio Mann, a Carthusian, and Lord Tankerville of Eton and Surrey, who was his keenest rival.

Dorset gained a reputation as a keen competitor. The Morning Post in 1773 wrote: "The Duke...having run a considerable number of notches from off strokes, the opposing fielders very unpolitely swarmed round his bat so close as to impede his making a full stroke; his Grace gently expostulated with them on this unfair mode, and pointed out their danger, which having no effect, he, with proper spirit made full play at a ball and in so doing brought one of the gentlemen to the ground".

In the same year, Dorset presented the Vine Cricket Ground, Sevenoaks, Kent, to the town, at a peppercorn rent, literally. It is one of the oldest cricket grounds in England. The first nationally reported cricket match had taken place here in the 1734 season when "The Gentlemen of Kent" beat "The Gentlemen of Sussex". Sevenoaks Town Council still has the Vine Cricket Club, though the rent doubled to two peppercorns after the pavilion was built in the 19th century. They must also pay the Lord Sackville (if asked) one cricket ball on 21 July each year.

In 1775, a full-scale riot broke out at the Artillery Ground when Dorset's side was not performing too well. In 1782 the Morning Chronicle noted that "His Grace is one of the few noblemen who endeavour to combine the elegance of modern luxury with the more manly sports of the old English times".

Dorset's patronage of cricket was expensive – the Whitehall Evening Post in 1783 noted that the cost to Dorset of maintaining his team, before bets, was £1,000 a year. This was a lot, but less than the amounts some of his contemporaries were spending on racing. The report went on to say that Dorset was unrivalled (among noblemen) "at cricket, tennis and billiards".

After Dorset became the British ambassador to France, he reportedly tried to promote cricket there amongst the locals and British expatriates with The Times noting that horse racing was losing popularity in France and cricket, on Dorset's recommendation, was taking its place. In 1786, The Times reported on a cricket match played by some English gentlemen in the Champs-Elysées: "His Grace of Dorset was, as usual, the most distinguished for skill and activity. The French, however, cannot imitate us in such vigorous exertions of the body, so that we seldom see them enter the lists".

British ambassador to France
In 1784, Dorset moved to Paris to serve as British ambassador to France. His official role was Ambassador Extraordinary and Plenipotentiary.

On 16 July 1789, two days after the Storming of the Bastille, Dorset reported to Secretary of State for Foreign Affairs Francis Osborne, 5th Duke of Leeds: "Thus, my Lord, the greatest revolution that we know anything of has been effected with, comparatively speaking—if the magnitude of the event is considered—the loss of very few lives. From this moment we may consider France as a free country, the King a very limited monarch, and the nobility as reduced to a level with the rest of the nation".

There is no official record of Dorset's recall but he is known to have been in Paris from the beginning of 1789 until 8 August that year when he left on leave and returned to England. He did not return to France and was temporarily replaced by his Embassy Secretary, Lord Robert Stephen FitzGerald (1765–1833; son of James FitzGerald, 1st Duke of Leinster), as Minister Plenipotentiary. New credentials were delivered by Dorset's official successor, Earl Gower, on 20 June 1790. Dorset's credentials were terminated on 29 June 1790.

There is a story that, as the revolution began, Dorset was planning what might have become the first international cricket tour by forming an England team to play matches in France. His team, said to have been captained by William Yalden, reportedly assembled at Dover on 10 August but met the Duke coming the other way and the tour was cancelled. According to John Major in More Than A Game, "the whole story is nonsense". Dorset had written to Leeds on 16 July and had already warned other British residents to leave Paris so, as Major points out, he would hardly have invited a cricket team to come to France at the time of such a crisis.

Back in England, Dorset's public life continued in the post of Steward of the Royal Household.

Personal life
Dorset was a notorious womaniser. He had an affair with Anne Parsons, the influential mistress of the Prime Minister, who had divorced his own wife for adultery and planned to marry Parsons until he discovered her infidelity with Dorset.

Dorset's best-known and most enduring mistress was the Venetian ballerina Giovanna Zanerini, who was the principal ballerina at the King's Theatre, Haymarket, and used the stage name Giovanna Baccelli. Dorset commissioned a painting of her in 1780–81 from Thomas Gainsborough, which is reckoned to be one of Gainsborough's later masterpieces. He also commissioned a painting by Joshua Reynolds and a sculpture showing her nude and prone on a divan and cushions; this is still to be found at Knole. When made Ambassador to France, Dorset even took her to Paris with him, and she danced at the Opera by invitation. (When he was made Knight of the Garter (KG), she wore the blue ribbon of the Garter while dancing.) Dorset and Giovanna had a son together: John Frederick Sackville (1778–1796), who was raised by his father at Paris and Knole after the couple parted in 1789.

The Duke was also known for his affair (c. 1777–1779) with the Countess of Derby, and briefly (c. 1784) with Lady Elizabeth Foster, daughter of Frederick Hervey, 4th Earl of Bristol and mistress of William Cavendish, 5th Duke of Devonshire. The first affair was notable because it did not lead to a divorce. The Countess of Derby was born Lady Elizabeth Hamilton, the only daughter of the 6th Duke of Hamilton and the beauty Elizabeth Gunning. However, the Earl of Derby refused to divorce his errant wife. This meant that Lady Derby was ostracized for the remainder of her life, and Dorset soon lost interest and abandoned his lover. He was received back into society, and even received by his former mistress's betrayed husband Lord Derby.

Marriage and descendants

In 1790, after returning from France, Dorset married twenty-three-year-old Arabella Diana Cope (1767–1825), daughter and co-heiress of Sir Charles Cope, 2nd Baronet, and stepdaughter of Charles Jenkinson, 1st Earl of Liverpool. Dorset and Arabella had one son together, George John Frederick, who was born on 15 November 1793, and two daughters, Lady Mary Sackville, born on 30 July 1792, and Lady Elizabeth Sackville, born on 11 August 1795. The Duke died in 1799, aged 54, and left a life interest in his estates and free disposition thereof (in case of the death of their young son) to his wife. At his death, Arabella was thus a very wealthy heiress and from 1799 until her own death in 1825, Arabella, Duchess of Dorset (as she preferred to be known) controlled the Sackville estates and wealth in trust for their son. She remarried 1801 Charles Whitworth, who became 1st Earl of Whitworth, but had no further issue.

George John Frederick became the 4th Duke of Dorset on his father's death at the family seat, Knole House, near Sevenoaks, Kent at age 6, but spent the rest of his life under the legal and financial control of his mother and stepfather. He died in a riding accident in Ireland, aged 21 having just become engaged to Lady Elizabeth Thynne (born 1795), elder daughter of Thomas Thynne, 2nd Marquess of Bath. (She went on to marry October 1816 Lord Cawdor and have many children). Although the dukedom passed to his cousin Charles, Viscount Sackville, the estates remained at the disposition of Arabella until her own death in 1825, when Knole went to her elder daughter Mary, Countess of Plymouth, and Buckhurst and the Middlesex lands (of the Cranfield family) to her younger daughter Elizabeth, Countess De La Warr.

Lady Mary Sackville had married firstly Other Windsor, 6th Earl of Plymouth (1789–1833) on 5 August 1811 and secondly her first husband's stepfather William Amherst, 1st Earl Amherst on 25 May 1839. She died childless on 20 July 1864, leaving her estates to her sister Countess De La Warr and her heirs male.

The Countess De La Ware was created Baroness Buckhurst in her own right (a title later inherited by a younger son Reginald who is ancestor of the present Earl De La Warr). Another line stemming from this lady is that of the Barons Sackville, a title created in compensation for losing the Buckhurst title. The 1st Baron Sackville inherited Knole, according to the will of Mary, Countess of Plymouth. (He died unmarried, as did his brother the 2nd Baron). Their nephew, the 3rd Baron Sackville, was father of the writer Vita Sackville-West who created a garden at Sissinghurst. Knole House, still lived in by the Sackville-West family, and Sissinghurst, the family home of Lord Carnock have both been given to the National Trust.

References

External links
 
 A database entry on the 3rd Duke of Dorset (retrieved on 20 February 2005)
  (retrieved on 20 February 2005)
 Sevenoaks Life - A History of Sevenoaks Town (retrieved on 20 February 2005)
 Archive page on Thomas Gainsborough
 Pictures of the 3rd Duke of Dorset held by the National Portrait Gallery
 Houses in Kent - Knole

1745 births
1799 deaths
18th-century philanthropists
Ambassadors of Great Britain to France
British MPs 1768–1774
Cricket patrons
Diplomatic peers
103
Earls of Dorset
English cricket administrators
English cricketers of 1701 to 1786
English cricketers
Hambledon cricketers
Hampshire cricketers
Kent cricketers
Lord-Lieutenants of Kent
Members of the Parliament of Great Britain for English constituencies
People educated at Westminster School, London
John
West Kent cricketers